The 2009–10 GMHL season was the fourth season of the Greater Metro Junior A Hockey League (GMHL). The twelve teams of the GMHL played 42-game schedules.

In February 2010, the top teams of the league played down for the Russell Cup, emblematic of the grand championship of the GMHL.  Since the GMHL is independent from Hockey Canada and the Canadian Junior Hockey League, this is where the GMHL's season ended.  The Deseronto Storm won their first Russell Cup beating the South Muskoka Shield 4-games-to-3.

Changes 
Expansion was granted to Algoma Avalanche.
Ville-Marie Dragons, which did not finish the 2008-09 season, moved and became Powassan Dragons.
Nipissing Alouettes, Richmond Hill Rams, and Espanola Kings were granted leaves of absence.
Ville-Marie Voyageurs were announced, but failed to start the season.
Minden Riverkings folded mid-season, on November 11, 2009.

Twelve teams started the season, and played as one division rather than two divisions, as the league operated in the previous year.

Final standings
Note: GP = Games played; W = Wins; L = Losses; OTL = Overtime losses; SL = Shootout losses; GF = Goals for; GA = Goals against; PTS = Points; x = clinched playoff berth; y = clinched division title; z = clinched conference title

Top seven teams (blue tinted) receive automatic bye into GMHL Quarter-finals.  Minden Riverkings ceased operation November 11, 2009.  Remaining games are treated as 3-0 forfeits.

Teams listed on the official league website.

Standings listed on official league website.

2009-10 Russell Cup Playoffs

Championship round
QF is Best-of-5, SF and Final are Best-of-7

Last Minute Qualifier
Determines 8th seed in Quarter-final.

Playoff results are listed on the official league website.

Scoring leaders 
Note: GP = Games played; G = Goals; A = Assists; Pts = Points; PIM = Penalty minutes

Leading goaltenders 
Note: GP = Games played; Mins = Minutes played; W = Wins; L = Losses: OTL = Overtime losses; SL = Shootout losses; GA = Goals Allowed; SO = Shutouts; GAA = Goals against average

Awards
Top Defensive Forward - Chad Meagher (South Muskoka Shield)
Rookie of the Year - Matis Matus (Bradford Rattlers)
Top Forward - Artem Podshendyalov (Bradford Rattlers)
Most Sportsmanlike Player - Dylan Sontag (South Muskoka Shield)
Top Defenceman - Adam MacBeth (South Muskoka Shield)
Most Heart - David Secfic (Elliot Lake Bobcats)
Top Goaltender - Mark Wardell (South Muskoka Shield)
Top Scorer - Brad Clark (Deseronto Storm)
Most Valuable Player - Brad Clark (Deseronto Storm)
Official of the Year - Darren Long
Coach of the Year - Dallyn Telford (South Muskoka Shield)

See also 
 2009 in ice hockey
 2010 in ice hockey

References

External links 
 Official website of the Greater Metro Junior A Hockey League

Greater Metro Junior A Hockey League seasons
GMHL